A Real Dead One is a live album by English heavy metal band Iron Maiden, released on 25 October 1993. It was recorded at various concerts across Europe, during the Fear of the Dark Tour in 1992 and the Real Live Tour in 1993. It features songs from the very beginning of the band's career (1975) through the Powerslave era (1984), while counterpart A Real Live One contains songs from only the post-Powerslave albums.

The album spent three weeks on the UK chart, and was promptly followed by Live at Donington.

When Maiden rereleased all of their pre-The X Factor albums in 1998, this album was combined with A Real Live One to form the two-disc A Real Live Dead One.

The cover is by long-time Maiden artist Derek Riggs, and depicts Eddie as a disc jockey in Hell.

"Hallowed Be Thy Name" was released as a single and hit No.9 on UK singles chart.

Track listing

Credits
Production credits are adapted from the album liner notes.
Iron Maiden
 Bruce Dickinson – vocals
 Dave Murray – guitar
 Janick Gers – guitar
 Steve Harris – bass guitar, producer, mixing
 Nicko McBrain – drums
Additional musicians
 Michael Kenney – keyboards
Production
 Mick McKenna – engineer
 Tim Young – mastering
Derek Riggs – cover illustration
Guido Karp – photography
George Chin – photography
Tony Mottram – photography
Rod Smallwood – management
Andy Taylor – management

Charts

References

External links
 

1993 live albums
EMI Records live albums
Iron Maiden live albums
Live heavy metal albums